Anomoeomunida caribensis is a species of squat lobster in a monotypic genus in the family Munididae.

References

External links

Squat lobsters
Monotypic crustacean genera